Eutolmus is a genus of flies belonging to the family Asilidae.

The species of this genus are found in Europe and Northern America.

Species:
 Eutolmus albicapillus Janssens, 1968 
 Eutolmus albiventris Villeneuve, 1920

References

Asilidae